Mordellistena palembanga is a species of beetle in the family Mordellidae. It was described by Maurice Pic in 1941 based on material from Sumatra, Indonesia.

References

palembanga
Beetles of Asia
Insects of Indonesia
Fauna of Sumatra
Beetles described in 1941
Taxa named by Maurice Pic